Sedum villosum, known as the hairy stonecrop or purple stonecrop, is a biennial to perennial flowering plant.

It is native to Greenland, Iceland and northern and central Europe, east to Lithuania and Poland. It has also been recorded from islands in south-eastern Canada. Within Britain, it is found as far south as mid-Yorkshire. Compared to other species in the genus Sedum, it is unusual in preferring damp habitats.

References

villosum